James Arthur Renwick CRSNZ is a New Zealand weather and climate researcher. He is professor of physical geography at Victoria University of Wellington, specialising in large-scale climate variations. He was awarded the 2018 New Zealand Prime Minister's Science Prize for Communication by Jacinda Ardern.

Career 

He started his career as a weather forecaster at the New Zealand Met Service (1978–1991). From there he moved to seasonal prediction and climate change studies at National Institute of Water and Atmospheric Research (1992–2002), and then to his present teaching and research role at Victoria University of Wellington. His interests include Southern Hemisphere climate variability (such as the El Niño/La Niña cycle and the mid-latitude westerly winds) and the impacts of climate variability and change on New Zealand.

He also works in climate-sea ice interaction.

Renwick was a Lead Author for the Intergovernmental Panel on Climate Change (IPCC) Fourth and Fifth Assessment Reports, as well as a Co-ordinating Lead Author for the IPCC's Sixth Assessment Report.

He was President of the New Zealand Association of Scientists 2009–2011.

Science communication 
He is a well-known science communicator in New Zealand. The citation for his 2018 Prime Minister's Science Prize for Communication stated that he "communicates with warmth, humour and positivity, while always being clear about the seriousness of the issue".  He communicates climate science in the context of art through an initiative called Track Zero.

Awards
 Prime Minister's Science Communication Prize winner, 2018
 Recipient, Edward Kidson Medal, Meteorological Society of N.Z., 2005
 Companion of the Royal Society of New Zealand

References 

New Zealand climatologists
University of Washington alumni
Victoria University of Wellington alumni
University of Canterbury alumni
Academic staff of the Victoria University of Wellington
Living people
Year of birth missing (living people)
Science communicators
Companions of the Royal Society of New Zealand